"Dr. Feelgood" is a song by American heavy metal band Mötley Crüe. It was released as the lead single from their fifth studio album of the same name.

"Dr. Feelgood" is Mötley Crüe's only gold single in the U.S. In 2009, it was ranked the 15th greatest hard rock song of all time by VH1.

Commercial performance
Released in 1989 as the album's first single, "Dr. Feelgood" became Mötley Crüe's first American Top Ten hit, peaking at No. 6 on the Billboard Hot 100 on October 28, 1989. It is their highest ranked single to this day. In November 1989, the single was certified Gold by the RIAA for more than 500,000 units shipped in the United States.

Personnel
 Vince Neil – lead vocals
 Mick Mars – lead guitar, backing vocals
 Nikki Sixx – bass guitar, backing vocals
 Tommy Lee – drums, backing vocals

Charts

Certifications

References

Mötley Crüe songs
1989 songs
1989 singles
Music videos directed by Wayne Isham
Songs written by Nikki Sixx
Songs written by Mick Mars
Song recordings produced by Bob Rock
Elektra Records singles